Peraetheis or Peraitheis, or Peraethea or Peraithea, was a town in ancient Arcadia, in the district Maenalia on the river Elaphus.

Its site is located near the modern Arachamites.

References

Populated places in ancient Arcadia
Former populated places in Greece